Susuk or charm needles, are needles made of gold or other precious metals, which are inserted into the soft tissues of the body to act as talismans. Susuk has various supposed purposes, ranging from the purely aesthetic to the treatment of joint pains and other minor ailments. This practice is also used as protection against injuries and accidents. Because the Susuk practice pre-dates the Islamicization of the region, it is prohibited (forbidden) by modern Islamic scholars (haraam).

With the advent age of modern medical technology i.e. radiography, the presence of susuk must be highlighted, as they may be mistaken for undesired foreign objects.

Beliefs
Susuk is claimed to be embedded accompanied by incantations and is usually done at a certain time to increase its effectiveness. It was also said that the susuk needs to be removed before death or the person will have difficulty dying. As such, susuk is usually removed once the person concerned is becoming old or falls ill. Removing the susuk also needs the skill of a knowledgeable person; usually the same person who inserted it in the first place. However, removing the susuk which was originally for beauty, will cause the person's face to revert to its natural age within six months. / 

Daisy Fajarina, mother of model Manohara Odelia Pinot, was said to have diamond and gold susuks in her chin.  Her ex-husband, George Manz said "Once when we were together, I took Daisy to a dentist who was then shocked when he saw her X-ray. She had small gold needles and diamond stones embedded inside her chin."

See also
 Acupuncture
 Body piercing

References

External links
Canadian Medical Association Journal article on the analysis of the health effects of multiple susuks in a patient, as detected by radiology
Royal College of Physicians, Edinburgh article on the detection and analysis of susuks; includes photos of skull x-rays with susuks  (requires Acrobat Reader)
Dentomaxillofacial Radiology article on susuks
Analysis of the Islamic stance on susuks, at Islam Online 

Malay culture
Body piercing jewellery